Sai Kung Islands is one of the 29 constituencies in the Sai Kung District.

The constituency returns one district councillor to the Sai Kung District Council, with an election every four years.

Sai Kung Islands constituency is loosely based on part of Sai Kung Peninsula and outer islands with estimated population of 12,894.

Councillors represented

Election results

2010s

References

Sai Kung Peninsula
Constituencies of Hong Kong
Constituencies of Sai Kung District Council
1982 establishments in Hong Kong
Constituencies established in 1982